The 1926 North Dakota Flickertails football team, also known as the Nodaks, was an American football team that represented the University of North Dakota in the North Central Conference (NCC) during the 1926 college football season. In their first year under head coach Tod Rockwell, the Flickertails compiled a 4–4 record (2–2 against NCC opponents), finished in a tie for seventh place out of nine teams in the NCC, and were outscored by a total of 121 to 63.

Schedule

References

North Dakota
North Dakota Fighting Hawks football seasons
North Dakota Flickertails football